Princess Royal Island is an uninhabited island within the Arctic Archipelago in the territory of Nunavut.

References

External links
 Princess Royal Island in the Atlas of Canada - Toporama; Natural Resources Canada

Islands of the Queen Elizabeth Islands
Uninhabited islands of Qikiqtaaluk Region